The 2018 Rio Grande Valley FC Toros season is the 3rd season for Rio Grande Valley FC Toros in United Soccer League (USL), the second-tier professional soccer league in the United States and Canada.

Club

Competitions

Preseason

United Soccer League

Standings

Match results

Unless otherwise noted, all times in CDT

References 

2018
American soccer clubs 2018 season